Lancelot Patrick Ross (January 19, 1906 – April 25, 1988) was an American singer, pianist and songwriter.

Biography
Ross was born in Seattle, Washington.  His parents were Douglas and Winifred Ross, both natives of England.  He graduated from Taft School in 1924, where he captained the track team and led the glee club, and Yale University in 1928, where he blossomed as one of the nation's foremost intercollegiate track performers as well as soloist with the famous Yale Glee Club, and he was a member of Zeta Psi and Skull and Bones.  Additionally, in 1931 he earned a law degree from Columbia Law School., earning the wherewithal by making radio appearances.  He also studied classical vocal technique at the Juilliard School of Music with Anna E. Schoen-René.

Career
Lanny Ross made his theatrical bow at the age of 4 performing with his father in Ben Greet's professional Shakespearean company. During his primary education in a Canadian convent and various Seattle and New York schools, young Ross confined his appearances to choir work, including term as head monitor at the Cathedral of St. John the Divine, NY. His career began in radio in 1928 and included a five-year run with Annette Hanshaw on the Maxwell House Show Boat program.  His recording career began in 1929.  He did so well on the radio that he gave up the legal profession and set forth on a singing career. Ross went on to success in vaudeville, night clubs and films.  He served in the U.S. Army in World War II, achieving the rank of Major. During the war, he was called upon to sing the Oscar-nominated ballad, "We Musn't Say Goodbye", for the 1943 motion picture, "Stage Door Canteen". The film also received an Oscar nomination for best musical score that year.

HIs radio programs have included Troubadour of the Moon, Maxwell House Showboat, Packard Mardi Gras, Lucky Strike Hit Parade and his own Lanny Ross Program, sponsored by Franco-American over the CBS Network.

Ross introduced the standard popular song "Stay as Sweet as You Are" (w. Mack Gordon m. Harry Revel) in the 1934 film College Rhythm.  He recorded the song with Nat W. Finston and the Paramount Recording Orchestra in Los Angeles on October 21, 1934.  It was released on Brunswick 7318 (matrix LA-247-A) and became Ross' most successful record.  He starred in two Paramount Pictures, Melody in Spring and College Rhythm, and also in The Lady Objects for Columbia Pictures.  In 1941 he drew critical acclaim for his acting in stock productions of Petticoat Fever, Pursuit of Happiness and Green Grow the Lilacs.

He co-wrote the song "Listen to My Heart" with Al J. Neiburg and Abner Silver.  It was performed in the 1939 short film Tempo of Tomorrow by Patricia Gilmore singing with the Richard Himber Orchestra.

Ross died in New York City.

Filmography

References

External links 
Voice Talk, Perspectives on the Art of Singing, Lanny Ross Retrieved April 14, 2013
Lanny Ross collection of recorded radio broadcasts, 1934–1942 in the Rodgers and Hammerstein Archives of Recorded Sound of The New York Public Library for the Performing Arts.
 New York Times obituary
 

1906 births
1988 deaths
Musicians from Seattle
American male pop singers
American male singer-songwriters
American tenors
Traditional pop music singers
Juilliard School alumni
Yale University alumni
Vaudeville performers
20th-century American singers
Singer-songwriters from Washington (state)
20th-century American male singers